Jim Meehan (30 June 1935 – 16 December 1988) was  a former Australian rules footballer who played with Richmond in the Victorian Football League (VFL).

Notes

External links 		
		
		
		
		
		
		
		
1935 births		
1988 deaths		
Australian rules footballers from Victoria (Australia)		
Richmond Football Club players